Insaan Aur Shaitan is a 1970 Bollywood action film directed by Aspi Irani. The film stars Sanjeev Kumar and Aruna Irani.

Cast
Sanjeev Kumar as Vijay 
Faryal as Ratna
Iftekhar   
Sheikh Mukhtar   
Gajanan Jagirdar   
Aruna Irani as Usha  
Hiralal   
M. B. Shetty   
Chaman Puri

Soundtrack

References

External links
 

1970 films
Indian action films
1970s Hindi-language films
1970s action films
Films scored by Usha Khanna